Dinardilla is a genus of rove beetles in the family Staphylinidae. There are at least two described species in Dinardilla.

Species
These two species belong to the genus Dinardilla:
 Dinardilla liometopi Wasmann, 1901
 Dinardilla mexicana Mann, 1914

References

Further reading

 
 
 
 

Aleocharinae
Articles created by Qbugbot